Woodrow Wilson Junior College may refer to:

Woodrow Wilson Junior College (Philippines)
The former name of Kennedy–King College, Chicago, United States